The following is an alphabetical list of articles related to the U.S. State of Nevada.

0–9 

.nv.us – Internet second-level domain for the state of Nevada
36th state to join the United States of America

A
Adjacent states:

Agriculture in Nevada
Airports in Nevada
Amusement parks in Nevada
Aquaria in Nevada
commons:Category:Aquaria in Nevada
Arboreta in Nevada
commons:Category:Arboreta in Nevada
Archaeology of Nevada
:Category:Archaeological sites in Nevada
commons:Category:Archaeological sites in Nevada
Architecture of Nevada
Art museums and galleries in Nevada
commons:Category:Art museums and galleries in Nevada
Astronomical observatories in Nevada
commons:Category:Astronomical observatories in Nevada

B
Black Rock Desert
Botanical gardens in Nevada
commons:Category:Botanical gardens in Nevada
Buildings and structures in Nevada
commons:Category:Buildings and structures in Nevada
Burning Man

C

Canyons and gorges of Nevada
commons:Category:Canyons and gorges of Nevada
Capital of the State of Nevada
Capitol of the State of Nevada
commons:Category:Nevada State Capitol
Carson City, Nevada, territorial and state capital since 1861
Casinos in Nevada
Caves of Nevada
commons:Category:Caves of Nevada
Census statistical areas of Nevada
Cities in Nevada
commons:Category:Cities in Nevada

Climate of Nevada
Climate change in Nevada
Colleges and universities in Nevada
commons:Category:Universities and colleges in Nevada
Colorado River
Communications in Nevada
commons:Category:Communications in Nevada
Companies in Nevada
Congressional districts of Nevada
Constitution of the State of Nevada
Convention centers in Nevada
commons:Category:Convention centers in Nevada
Counties of the state of Nevada
commons:Category:Counties in Nevada
Culture of Nevada
commons:Category:Nevada culture

D
Demographics of Nevada

E
Economy of Nevada
:Category:Economy of Nevada
commons:Category:Economy of Nevada
Education in Nevada
:Category:Education in Nevada
commons:Category:Education in Nevada
Elections of the state of Nevada
commons:Category:Nevada elections
Energy in Nevada
Environment of Nevada
commons:Category:Environment of Nevada

F

Festivals in Nevada
commons:Category:Festivals in Nevada
Flag of the state of Nevada
Flamingo Resort, Inc. v. United States

G
Geography of Nevada
:Category:Geography of Nevada
commons:Category:Geography of Nevada
Geology of Nevada
commons:Category:Geology of Nevada
Geysers of Nevada
commons:Category:Geysers of Nevada
Ghost towns in Nevada
:Category:Ghost towns in Nevada
commons:Category:Ghost towns in Nevada
Gold mining in Nevada
Golf clubs and courses in Nevada
Government of the State of Nevada  website
:Category:Government of Nevada
commons:Category:Government of Nevada
Governor of the State of Nevada
List of governors of Nevada
Great Seal of the State of Nevada

H
Heritage railroads in Nevada
commons:Category:Heritage railroads in Nevada
High schools of Nevada
Higher education in Nevada
Highway Patrol of Nevada
Highway routes in Nevada
Hiking trails in Nevada
commons:Category:Hiking trails in Nevada
History of Nevada
Historical outline of Nevada
:Category:History of Nevada
commons:Category:History of Nevada
Hospitals in Nevada
Hot springs of Nevada
commons:Category:Hot springs of Nevada
House of Representatives of the State of Nevada

I
Images of Nevada
commons:Category:Nevada
Islands in Nevada

J

K

L
Lakes of Nevada
Lake Tahoe
commons:Category:Lakes of Nevada
Landmarks in Nevada
commons:Category:Landmarks in Nevada
Las Vegas, Nevada
Lieutenant Governor of the State of Nevada
Lists related to the State of Nevada:
List of airports in Nevada
List of census statistical areas in Nevada
List of cities in Nevada
List of colleges and universities in Nevada
List of United States congressional districts in Nevada
List of counties in Nevada
List of dams and reservoirs in Nevada
List of ghost towns in Nevada
List of governors of Nevada
List of high schools in Nevada
List of highway routes in Nevada
List of hospitals in Nevada
List of Indian reservations in Nevada
List of individuals executed in Nevada
List of islands in Nevada
List of lakes in Nevada
List of law enforcement agencies in Nevada
List of mountain ranges in Nevada
List of museums in Nevada
List of National Historic Landmarks in Nevada
List of newspapers in Nevada
List of people from Nevada
List of power stations in Nevada
List of radio stations in Nevada
List of railroads in Nevada
List of Registered Historic Places in Nevada
List of rivers of Nevada
List of school districts in Nevada
List of state parks in Nevada
List of state prisons in Nevada
List of symbols of the State of Nevada
List of television stations in Nevada
List of United States congressional delegations from Nevada
List of United States congressional districts in Nevada
List of United States representatives from Nevada
List of United States senators from Nevada
List of valleys of Nevada

M
Maps of Nevada
commons:Category:Maps of Nevada
Mass media in Nevada
Mountain ranges in Nevada
Mountains of Nevada
commons:Category:Mountains of Nevada
Museums in Nevada
:Category:Museums in Nevada
commons:Category:Museums in Nevada
Music of Nevada
commons:Category:Music of Nevada
:Category:Musical groups from Nevada
:Category:Musicians from Nevada

N
National Forests of Nevada
commons:Category:National Forests of Nevada
Natural arches of Nevada
commons:Category:Natural arches of Nevada
Natural gas pipelines in Nevada
Natural history of Nevada
commons:Category:Natural history of Nevada
Nevada  website
:Category:Nevada
commons:Category:Nevada
commons:Category:Maps of Nevada
Nevada Highway Patrol
Nevada Numbers (lottery-style game played in selected casinos)
Nevada Renewable Energy and Energy Efficiency Authority
Nevada State Capitol
Newspapers of Nevada
NV – United States Postal Service postal code for the State of Nevada

O
Outdoor sculptures in Nevada
commons:Category:Outdoor sculptures in Nevada

P
People from Nevada
:Category:People from Nevada
commons:Category:People from Nevada
:Category:People by city in Nevada
:Category:People by county in Nevada
:Category:People from Nevada by occupation
Politics of Nevada
commons:Category:Politics of Nevada
Prostitution in Nevada
Protected areas of Nevada
commons:Category:Protected areas of Nevada

Q
Quoeech

R
Radio stations in Nevada
Railroad museums in Nevada
commons:Category:Railroad museums in Nevada
Railroads in Nevada
Registered historic places in Nevada
commons:Category:Registered Historic Places in Nevada
Religion in Nevada
:Category:Religion in Nevada
commons:Category:Religion in Nevada
Reno, Nevada
Rivers of Nevada
commons:Category:Rivers of Nevada
Rock formations in Nevada
commons:Category:Rock formations in Nevada
Roller coasters in Nevada
commons:Category:Roller coasters in Nevada

S
School districts of Nevada
Scouting in Nevada
Senate of the State of Nevada
Settlements in Nevada
Cities in Nevada
Towns in Nevada
Villages in Nevada
Census Designated Places in Nevada
Other unincorporated communities in Nevada
List of ghost towns in Nevada
Silver mining in Nevada
Ski areas and resorts in Nevada
commons:Category:Ski areas and resorts in Nevada
Solar power in Nevada
Southern Desert Regional Police Academy
Sports in Nevada
:Category:Sports in Nevada
commons:Category:Sports in Nevada
:Category:Sports venues in Nevada
commons:Category:Sports venues in Nevada
State Capitol of Nevada
State of Nevada  website
Constitution of the State of Nevada
Government of the State of Nevada
:Category:Government of Nevada
commons:Category:Government of Nevada
Executive branch of the government of the State of Nevada
Governor of the State of Nevada
Legislative branch of the government of the State of Nevada
Legislature of the State of Nevada
Senate of the State of Nevada
House of Representatives of the State of Nevada
Judicial branch of the government of the State of Nevada
Supreme Court of the State of Nevada
State parks of Nevada
commons:Category:State parks of Nevada
State police of Nevada
State prisons of Nevada
Structures in Nevada
commons:Category:Buildings and structures in Nevada
Supreme Court of the State of Nevada
Symbols of the State of Nevada
:Category:Symbols of Nevada
commons:Category:Symbols of Nevada

T
Telecommunications in Nevada
commons:Category:Communications in Nevada
Telephone area codes in Nevada
Television shows set in Nevada
Television stations in Nevada
Territory of Nevada
Theatres in Nevada
commons:Category:Theatres in Nevada
Tourism in Nevada  website
commons:Category:Tourism in Nevada
Transportation in Nevada
:Category:Transportation in Nevada
commons:Category:Transport in Nevada
Treaty of Guadalupe Hidalgo of 1848

U
United States of America
States of the United States of America
United States census statistical areas of Nevada
United States congressional delegations from Nevada
United States congressional districts in Nevada
United States Court of Appeals for the Ninth Circuit
United States District Court for the District of Nevada
United States representatives from Nevada
United States senators from Nevada
Universities and colleges in Nevada
commons:Category:Universities and colleges in Nevada
US-NV – ISO 3166-2:US region code for the State of Nevada
USA Capital

V

W
Water parks in Nevada
Wikimedia
Wikimedia Commons:Category:Nevada
commons:Category:Maps of Nevada
Wikinews:Category:Nevada
Wikinews:Portal:Nevada
Wikipedia Category:Nevada
Wikipedia Portal:Nevada
Wikipedia:WikiProject Nevada
:Category:WikiProject Nevada articles
:Category:WikiProject Nevada participants
Wind power in Nevada

X

Y

Z
Zoos in Nevada
commons:Category:Zoos in Nevada

See also

Topic overview:
Nevada
Outline of Nevada

Nevada
 
Nevada